The OTO Melara 76 mm gun is a naval gun built and designed by the Italian defence company OTO Melara. It is based on the OTO Melara 76/62C and evolved toward 76/62 SR and 76/62 Strales.

The system is compact enough to be installed on relatively small warships. Its high rate of fire and the availability of several types of ammunition make it capable of short-range anti-missile point defence, anti-aircraft, anti-surface, and ground support. Ammunition includes armour-piercing, incendiary, directed fragmentation effects, and a guided round marketed as capable of destroying maneuvering anti-ship missiles. It can be installed in a stealth cupola.

The OTO Melara 76 mm has been widely exported, and is in use by sixty navies. It was favored over the French 100mm naval gun for the joint French/Italian  project and FREMM frigate.

On 27 September 2006 Iran announced it had started mass production of a naval gun named the Fajr-27, which is a reverse-engineered OTO Melara 76 mm gun.

Other specifications
 Cooling: sea water—fresh water for flushing
 Electrical Power supply
 440 V, 3-phase, 60 Hz, main circuit;
 115 V, 1-phase, 400 Hz, servo and synchro network

Variants

Compact 
The original version has a rate of fire of 85 rounds per minute.

Super Rapid 
The Super Rapid or "Super Rapido" variant, with a higher rate of fire of 120 rounds per minute, was developed in the early 1980s and remained current . The Super Rapid's higher rate of fire was achieved by designing a faster feed system.

Strales System 
The Italian navy preferred the improved Super Rapido with Strales System and DART ammunition to the Fast Forty 40 mm CIWS in the anti-missile defense role as it is capable of countering several subsonic missiles up to 8,000 meters away. It is a medium caliber gun with relatively long range, and can also be used against surface targets.

Sovraponte 
The 76/62 Sovraponte ("over deck") is a new compact lightweight mount for the 76/62 gun. The system is around 30–40% lighter than the standard Super Rapid and its installation requires no penetration of the deck below; the mount houses 76 ready-to-fire rounds and is available for sale both with or without the Strales system. The Sovraponte mount was installed for the first time on the Thaon di Revel-class patrol vessel of the Italian Navy, positioned above the roof of the helicopter hangar.

Ammunition
To provide multiple roles for the gun, OTO provides the user with wide ranges of specialized ammunition:
 HE standard: weight 6.296 kg, range 16 km, effective 8 km (4 km vs. air targets at 85°)
 MOM: developed by OTO (Multirole OTO Munition)
 PFF: anti-missile projectile, with proximity fuze and tungsten balls embedded in the shell for defined fragmentation effect
 SAPOM: 6.35 kg (0.46 kg HE), range 16 km (SAPOMER: 20 km) semi-armour piercing
 DART: guided projectile for anti-aircraft and anti-missile manoeuvering targets
 VULCANO: 5 kg, guided projectile with a maximum range around 40 km (it is a smaller version of the 127 mm Vulcano)<ref>Stanglini, Ruggero: Dart/DAVIDE, antimissile, ma non solo, PD Magazine, Ed.ai, Firenze, June 2003</ref>

Fire control system
There were evolutions in the gun's fire control systems as well. The early versions (Compatto) utilised radars such the RTN-10X Orion (made by Selenia, now Selex);

From the early 1980s the gun was equipped with a more powerful and flexible system, the RTN-30X (used with the Dardo-E CIWS system and known within the Italian Navy as SPG-73), that was capable to manage both guns (40, 76, and 127 mm calibres) and missiles (Sea Sparrow-Aspide). This system came into service with the Italian Navy on the cruiser Garibaldi (C551: the RTN-30X entered service first on the s; the Dardo 40 mm turret was slaved to the smaller and older RTN-20X radars), but still with the twin 40 mm Dardo's turrets. The first ship equipped with Dardo E and 76 mm Super Rapido was the upgraded s, later followed by the Durand de la Penne class. The 76/62 has also been used with many other fire control systems when not in Italian service.

Fuses
There have been many developments in the fuses, essential to shoot down low-flying missiles. The best fuze developed for the 76/62 guns is arguably the 3A-Plus programmable multi-role fuse, manufactured by Oto Melara and Simmel Difesa, introduced in the early 2000s. This fuse requires the installation of a fuse programmer in the mount.

The programmable multi-role fuse features several modes including a time mode for air burst and a number of proximity modes: gated proximity, anti-missile proximity, conventional air defense proximity and anti-surface proximity.

The fusing includes a DSP which rejects ground/sea clutter and so is capable of detecting a missile flying as low as two meters above sea level. It has the capability to recognise a target at a 10-meter stand-off. In all, the fuze greatly increases the effectiveness of the gun when engaging anti-ship missiles.

DART
Since the 1980s efforts were made for development of guided 76 mm ammunition, but this was not achieved until recently. The first such ammunition was the CCS (Course Corrected Shell), also known as 'CORRETTO'; a joint program of OTO and British Aerospace. Work started in 1985. The projectile had several small rockets in order to deviate the trajectory. Radio commands were sent from the ship FCS. The FCS did not know the exact position of the projectile, only that of the target. This system was too complex and unreliable, so OTO studied another development in order to obtain a real 'guided ammunition'.

The result of this development is a system which was called DAVIDE just for the Italian market and STRALES for export purposes while the fired guided ammunition is called DART (Driven Ammunition Reduced Time of flight).

The DART projectile is similar in many aspects to other hyper-velocity systems, for example the Starstreak SAM missile's multi-dart warhead, but is a guided gun projectile with radio controls and a proximity fuze for low level engagement (up to 2 meters over the sea). The DART projectile is made of two parts: the forward is free to rotate and has two small canard wings for flight control. The aft part has the 2.5 kg warhead (with tungsten cubes and the 3A millimetric wave new fuse), six fixed wings and the radio receivers.

The guidance system is Command Line of Sight (CLOS). It uses a TX antenna installed on gun. The radio-command for them is provided on a broadcast data-link (Ka Band).

The first lot of DART 76mm guided ammunition, produced by OTO Melara, was successfully tested at the end of March, 2014. The firing trials were conducted on board one of the Italian Navy's ships equipped with Strales 76mm SR and Selex NA25 fire control system. The first firing trials of the DART ammunition bought by Colombia in 2012 were successfully conducted in the Caribbean Sea on 29 August from the 76/62 Strales inner-layer defence system fitted to its modernized FS 1500 Padilla-class frigates.

VULCANO
The more recent development is the VULCANO 76 ammunition system. Basically, it is a scaled-down version of the 127–155 mm Vulcano family of extended-range projectiles developed by OTO Melara; guided by Inertial Navigation System and Global Positioning Systems, it is capable of hitting targets twice the distance of normal 76 mm gun ammunition. GPS-IMU guidance and IR or SALT Terminal sensor.
The Vulcan 76 GLR ammunition is expected to complete the development, test and qualification process by late 2022 with the delivery of production rounds to customers from 2023–24 onwards.

Other uses

Most of the basic ammunition types offered for the OTO Melara 76mm can also be fired from the South African Rooikat armoured car with slight modification to change from electric to percussion primers. This is the only land-based vehicle system capable of deploying the same ammunition as its naval counterpart.

Operators

Asia

 BNS Bangabandhu (Ulsan class frigate)
 BNS Somudra Joy (ex-USCG Hamilton-class cutter)
 BNS Somudra Avijan(ex-USCG Hamilton-class cutter)

  (ex-RNLN Van Speijk class) 
 
 OPV 90M (Planned)
 
 Paiton Naval Gunnery Firing Range (OTO Melara 76mm Compact)

 
 
 
 
 
 
 
 
 INS Vikrant (aircraft carrier)

 
 
 

 
 
  destroyer
  (JDS Murakumo only)
 
 
 
 

 (OTO Melara 76mm gun believed to have been acquired illegally from Iran or Myanmar)

 Nampo-class corvette
 Nongo-class Fast Attack Craft

 
 
 
 

 
 

 
 
 

 

 Alamgir frigate (ex-USN Oliver Hazard Perry-class frigate)

 
 Del Pilar-classoffshore patrol vessel
 
 BRP Conrado Yap
  (planned)

 
 
 

 
 
 
 
 Independence-class littoral mission vessel

 SLNS Gajabahu (P626) (ex-USCG Hamilton-class cutter)
 
 Surnimila-class missile boat

 
 
 
 

 Pattani offshore patrol vessel
 
 
 
 
 
 
 
 Krabi offshore patrol vessel

 
 
 
 
 
 

 

 Combattante FS56-class fast attack craft

 Pohang-class corvette
 Hamilton-class cutter (operated by Vietnam Coast Guard)

Africa

 Kalaat Béni Abbès-class

 Ambassador MK III-class missile boat
 
 
 
 
 Gowind 2500 corvette
 FREMM multipurpose frigate

 Mohammed VI FREMM frigate
 Sigma-class corvette
 
 
 
 

  (converted from fast attack craft with missiles launchers and rear 76mm gun removed)
 

 

Europe

 

  (retired)
  (retired)
 
 
 
 

 FREMM multipurpose frigate
 

 
 
 
 
 

 

 
 
 
 
 
 
 
 
 

 
 
 

  (retired)
 
 
 
 FREMM multipurpose frigate
 Fulmine gunboat (retired)
  (retired)
 
 
  (hydrofoil, retired)
 Thaon di Revel-class offshore patrol vessel
 Trieste LHD

 
 

 
 

 
 ORP Ślązak offshore patrol vessel

  (ex-RNLN Karel Doorman-class frigate)

 
 

 
 
 Hetman Ivan Mazepa Ada-class corvette (under construction/launched (as of the beginning of 2023))''

Oceania

  (retired)

North America

  (after TRUMP modifications, retired 2017)

  (USCG)
  (USCG)
  (USN, retired)
  (USN, retired)

South America

 
 

 Tamandaré-class frigate

 
 
 
  (retired)

  – modernised with Strales 76 mm and DART guided ammunition
 

 
 

 

 Guaiquerí OPV
 Guaicamacuto OPV
 Constitución Class OPV

See also
 76mm/L62 Allargato – the direct precursor of the Melara
 AK-176 – a similar Soviet/Russian weapon
 Otomatic – a land-based SPAA version of the Super Rapid, mounted on OF-40 chassis
 Draco – a land-based SPAA version of the Strales system, mounted on B1 Centauro chassis

References

External links

 Official website of Leonardo – Strales
 Official website of Leonardo – Vulcano 76
 Official website of Leonardo – Draco
 
 Italian 76 mm/62 (3") Compact, SR and United States 76 mm/62 (3") Mark 75 at NavWeaps

76
76 mm artillery
Naval guns of Italy
Post–Cold War weapons of Germany
Autocannon
OTO Melara
Military equipment introduced in the 1960s